Michael Kaminski (born 2 September 1951) is an English musician. He is best known for playing violin in the rock band Electric Light Orchestra (ELO) between 1973 and 1979 and touring from 1981 to 1986, as well as being a member of Electric Light Orchestra Part II from 1991 until its end 2000 and The Orchestra from 2000–present.

Early life
Kaminski was born in Harrogate, West Riding of Yorkshire, England. He made his first professional performance with the Leeds Orchestra when he was 14. During his time at the Leeds School of Music, he founded the band Cow, together with his friends John Hodgson, who played drums, and John Marcangelo, who played keyboards and other percussion.

Career
In 1973, he joined Joe Soap and played violin on their Keep It Clean album. Their producer Sandy Roberton suggested Kaminski to Andy Roberts, who needed a violinist for his album. Thus Kaminski played in 1973 on Roberts' Andy Roberts and The Grand Stampede.

After those albums Kaminski applied for the vacant post as ELO's violinist because of an advertisement in Melody Maker. He was recruited after two interviews and was also the only person auditioning who did not play a wrong note. Bandleader Jeff Lynne held the audition.

During his stint in ELO, Kaminski initially tried to imitate his predecessor Wilf Gibson by wearing a cape while playing the violin, but soon acquired his trademark blue violin, which he has played variants of ever since. Kaminski's own band is called Blue Violin.

Kaminski was one of the three remaining string players for the group when Lynne decided to remove them. However, he performed on the tours for the ELO albums Time and Balance of Power, and on the 1983 single "Rock 'n' Roll Is King".  Later, he joined the ELO offshoot ELO Part II, playing as part of the live touring band.

Apart from the hits he had with ELO, in early 1979 Kaminski made the Top 40 of the UK Singles Chart as the frontman of a one-hit wonder group called Violinski, with the single "Clog Dance".

Kaminski was featured as violinist on a selection of tracks from the second studio album, Beauty In Chaos, by the Anglo-Irish acoustic duo Fay & Latta.

In 2000, Kaminski set out on tour under the moniker The Orchestra featuring former members of ELO and ELO II.

References

1951 births
Living people
British male violinists
Electric Light Orchestra members
People from Harrogate
Musicians from Yorkshire
British rock violinists
English classical violinists
English classical musicians
21st-century classical violinists
Male classical violinists